This is a list of universities and college schools of music by country. For the main article about university and college schools of music, see music school.

Academy of Arts in Tirana

Yerevan Komitas State Conservatory
Armenian State Pedagogical University

Australian National Academy of Music
Australian Youth Orchestra
Box Hill Institute of TAFE
Australian National University School of Music
Elder Conservatorium of Music, University of Adelaide
Macquarie University
Melba Memorial Conservatorium of Music
University of Melbourne
Melbourne Conservatorium of Music
Victorian College of the Arts School of Music
Monash University School of Music
Queensland Conservatorium Griffith University
University of Queensland School of Music
Sydney Conservatorium of Music
University of Newcastle Conservatorium
University of Tasmania Conservatorium
University of Western Australia Conservatorium of Music
Western Sydney University
Western Australian Academy of Performing Arts
University of New South Wales

Anton Bruckner Private University for Music, Drama, and Dance
 Musik und Kunst Privatuniversität der Stadt Wien
 Universität für Musik und Darstellende Kunst "Mozarteum" Salzburg (University Mozarteum Salzburg)
 Universität für Musik und darstellende Kunst Wien
 Universität für Musik und darstellende Kunst Graz
 Jam Music Lab Private University for Jazz and Popular Music Vienna

Azerbaijan National Conservatory Music College
 Baku Academy of Music
 Shusha Music School

Royal Conservatoire of Antwerp
Royal Conservatory of Ghent
Royal Conservatory of Brussels
Muda Institute
Lemmensinstituut
Conservatoire Royal de Liège

University of Sarajevo, Sarajevo Music Academy



Conservatories
 Conservatório Brasileiro de Música
 Conservatório Pernambucano de Música
 Conservatório de Tatuí
 Escola de Música da Universidade Federal do Rio de Janeiro
 Escola Municipal de Música de São Paulo
 :pt:Conservatorio Municipal de Arte de Guarulhos
 :pt:Escola Técnica Municipal de Música e Dança Ivanildo Rebouças - Cubatão

Universities and Colleges
 Universidade Federal do Rio Grande do Sul
 Faculdade Cantareira
 Faculdade de Música do Espírito Santo
 Faculdade Santa Marcelina
 Universidade de Brasília
 Universidade de Campinas
 Universidade de Caxias do Sul
 Universidade de São Paulo
 Universidade Estadual de Maringá
 Universidade Estadual Paulista
 Universidade Federal de Goiás
 Universidade Federal de Minas Gerais
 Universidade Federal de Uberlândia
 Universidade Federal do Espírito Santo
 Universidade Federal do Rio Grande do Norte
 Universidade Federal da Paraíba
 Universidade Federal de Santa Maria
 Universidade Federal do Rio de Janeiro
 Universidade Federal do Estado do Rio de Janeiro - UNIRIO



Plovdiv
Academy of Music, Dance, and Fine Arts

Sofia

National Academy of music "Prof.Pancho Vladigerov"



Alberta
Banff Centre
MacEwan University
University of Alberta
University of Calgary
University of Lethbridge
The King's University
Indian Music Academy

British Columbia
Vancouver Academy of Music
Capilano University
Simon Fraser University
University of British Columbia
University of Victoria
Victoria Conservatory of Music
Vancouver Island University
Selkirk College
Kwantlen Polytechnic University

Manitoba
University of Manitoba
 Brandon University

New Brunswick
Mount Allison University
University of Moncton
University of New Brunswick

Newfoundland and Labrador
Memorial University of Newfoundland

Nova Scotia
Acadia University
Dalhousie University
Maritime Conservatory of Performing Arts
St. Francis Xavier

Prince Edward Island
University of Prince Edward Island

Ontario
Brock University
Carleton University
Humber College
Lakehead University
McMaster University
Queen's University at Kingston
Royal Conservatory of Music (Toronto), The Glenn Gould School
Thamil Isai Kalaamanram
University of Guelph
University of Ottawa
University of Toronto, Faculty of Music
University of Waterloo
University of Western Ontario
Wilfrid Laurier University
York University

Quebec

Anglophone
McGill University Schulich School of Music
Bishop's University
Concordia University

Francophone
Conservatoire de musique et d'art dramatique du Québec
Université Laval
Université de Montréal
Université de Sherbrooke

Saskatchewan
University of Regina
University of Saskatchewan

Projazz
Escuela Moderna



Beijing
Central Conservatory of Music
China Conservatory of Music

Tianjin
Tianjin Conservatory of Music

Hubei
Wuhan Conservatory of Music

Guangdong
Xinghai Conservatory of Music

Shanghai
Shanghai Conservatory of Music

Shaanxi
Xi'an Conservatory of Music

Liaoning
Shenyang Conservatory of Music

Sichuan
Sichuan Conservatory of Music

Suzhou
[[Suzhou University School of Music 
http://music.suda.edu.cn/cn/]]

Pontificia Universidad Javeriana
 Universidad El Bosque
 Universidad de los Andes
 Universidad de Antioquia
 Universidad Nacional de Colombia
 Universidad EAFIT
 Universidad Sergio Arboleda
 Universidad del Valle

National University of Costa Rica
University of Costa Rica

Music Academy Zagreb
Academy of Arts, Osijek
Academy of Arts, Split
Juraj Dobrila University of Pula, Department of Music, Pula

Arte Music Academy
School of Music Kyriakides

Janáček Academy of Music and Performing Arts in Brno
Musical Academy of Performing Arts in Prague

Rhythmic Music Conservatory, Copenhagen
 Royal Danish Academy of Music, Copenhagen
 Royal Academy of Music in Aarhus
 Danish National Academy of Music, Odense/Esbjerg

Conservatorio Nacional de Música

Conservatorio de Música Franz Liszt
 Conservatorio Superior Nacional de Música de Quito
 Academia de Música Vivaldi Quito
 Universidad San Francisco de Quito
 Universidad Católica de Santiago de Guayaquil
 Universidad de Especialidades Espíritu Santo

Cairo Conservatoire
 Alexandria Conservatoire
 Cairo Opera House
 Alexandria Opera House
 Le Conservatoire De Musique D' Alexandrie

Sibelius Academy
 TAMK - Bachelor of music
 Yousician

Conservatoire national supérieur de musique et de danse de Paris (CNSMDP)
 Conservatoire national supérieur de musique et de danse de Lyon (CNSMDL)
École supérieure de musique Bourgogne-Franche-Comté, Dijon (ESM, Dijon)
École supérieure musique et danse Hauts-de-France, Lille (ESMD, Lille)
Institut d’enseignement supérieur de la musique Europe et Méditerranée (ISEM) 
Institut supérieur des arts de Toulouse (L'isdaT)
Pôle supérieur d'enseignement artistique Aubervilliers - La Courneuve - Seine-Saint-Denis - Île-de-France (Pôle Sup 93) 
Pôle supérieur d'enseignement artistique Paris Boulogne-Billancourt (PSPBB) 
Pôle d'enseignement supérieur de musique et de danse Bordeaux Nouvelle-Aquitaine (PESMD) 
Pôle d'enseignement supérieur spectacle vivant Bretagne - Pays de la Loire (Pont Supérieur)
 Haute école des arts du Rhin (HEAR) Académie supérieure de musique de Strasbourg
École normale de musique de Paris (ENMP) (Etablissement privé)

Pedagogy
 Conservatoire national supérieur de musique et de danse de Paris (CNSMDP)
 Centre de formation des enseignants de danse et de musique (CEFEDEM)  (Aubagne, Dijon, Toulouse, Bordeaux, Nantes, Metz, Lille, Lyon, Rouen, Poitiers, Rueil-Malmaison)



Universities of Music and Performing Arts
Aachen: Hochschule für Musik Köln, Abt. Aachen
Augsburg: Leopold Mozart Centre (Leopold-Mozart-Zentrum of the University of Augsburg)
Berlin: Hochschule für Musik Hanns Eisler
Berlin: Universität der Künste Berlin
Bremen: Hochschule für Künste Bremen
Detmold: Hochschule für Musik Detmold
Dresden: Hochschule für Musik Carl Maria von Weber Dresden"
Düsseldorf: Robert Schumann Hochschule and the Institute for Music and Media
Essen: Folkwang Hochschule
Frankfurt am Main: Frankfurt University of Music and Performing Arts
Freiburg im Breisgau: Hochschule für Musik Freiburg
Halle (Saale): Martin Luther University of Halle-Wittenberg, Institut für Musikpädagogik
Hamburg: Hochschule für Musik und Theater Hamburg
Hannover: Hochschule für Musik, Theater und Medien Hannover
Karlsruhe: Hochschule für Musik Karlsruhe
Köln: Hochschule für Musik Köln
Leipzig: Felix Mendelssohn College of Music and Theatre
Lübeck: Musikhochschule Lübeck
Mainz: Hochschule für Musik Mainz at the Johannes Gutenberg University of Mainz
Mannheim: Hochschule für Musik und Darstellende Kunst Mannheim
München: Hochschule für Musik und Theater München
München: Bayerische Theaterakademie August Everding
Münster: Westfälische Wilhelms-Universität Münster, Musikhochschule 
Osnabrück: Universität Osnabrück, Institute for Musicology and Music Education
Rostock: Hochschule für Musik und Theater Rostock
Saarbrücken: Hochschule für Musik Saar 
Stuttgart: State University of Music and Performing Arts Stuttgart 
Trossingen: Hochschule für Musik Trossingen
Weimar: Hochschule für Musik "Franz Liszt", Weimar 
Würzburg: Hochschule für Musik Würzburg
Wuppertal: Hochschule für Musik Köln, Abt. Wuppertal

Universities of Church Music
Aachen: Katholische Hochschule für Kirchenmusik St. Gregorius Aachen 
Bayreuth: Evangelische Hochschule für Kirchenmusik 
Dresden: Evangelische Hochschule für Kirchenmusik
Görlitz: Hochschule für Kirchenmusik der Evangelischen Kirche Berlin-Brandenburg – schlesische Oberlausitz 
Halle (Saale): Evangelische Hochschule für Kirchenmusik Halle 
Heidelberg: Evangelische Hochschule für Kirchenmusik Heidelberg 
Herford: Evangelische Hochschule für Kirchenmusik 
Regensburg: Hochschule für Katholische Kirchenmusik und Musikpädagogik 
Rottenburg: Katholische Hochschule für Kirchenmusik 
Tübingen: Evangelische Hochschule für Kirchenmusik

Conservatories
Berlin: Stern'sches Konservatorium
Darmstadt: Akademie für Tonkunst
Frankfurt am Main: Dr. Hoch’s Konservatorium – Musikakademie
Hamburg: Hamburger Konservatorium
Kassel: Musikakademie der Stadt Kassel
Leipzig: Felix Mendelssohn College of Music and Theatre
Mainz: Peter Cornelius Conservatory (Peter-Cornelius-Konservatorium der Stadt Mainz)
München: Richard-Strauss-Konservatorium – Fachakademie für Musik der Stadt München
Nürnberg: Hochschule für Musik Nürnberg
Osnabrück: Fachhochschule Osnabrück - Konservatorium
Trossingen: Hohner-Konservatorium

Academies of church music
Berlin: Spandauer Kirchenmusikschule (Berliner Kirchenmusikschule)

Tbilisi State Conservatoire
Ilia State University Music Centre



Universities
National and Kapodistrian University of Athens, Department of Music Studies, Athens,  (in Greek and English)
Aristotle University of Thessaloniki, School of Music Studies, Thessaloniki,  (in Greek and English)
University of Macedonia, Department of Music Science and Art, Thessaloniki,  (in Greek and English)
University of Ioannina, Department of Music Studies, Arta,  (in Greek)
 Ionian University, Department of Music Studies, Corfu,  (in Greek and English)

Conservatories
 Athens Conservatoire, Athens,  (in Greek) 
 National Conservatoire,  (in Greek)
Hellenic Conservatory,  (in Greek)
 Philippos Nakas Conservatory,  (in Greek)
 State Conservatory of Thessaloniki, Thessaloniki,  (in Greek)
 Synchrono Conservatory of Thessaloniki, Thessaloniki,  (in Greek)
 Mousiko Kollegio Conservatory, Thessaloniki,  (in Greek)
Nikos Skalkottas Conservatory, Athens,  (in Greek)

College for Fine Arts
Conservatorio Sampedrano de las Artes
Escuela de Musica Victoriano Lopez

The Hong Kong Academy for Performing Arts
The University of Hong Kong Music Department
The Baptist University Music Department
The Chinese University Music Department
The Education University of Hong Kong Department of Cultural and Creative Arts

Franz Liszt Academy of Music

Iceland Academy of the Arts

Central University of Sikkim
Sangeet Music Academy
Angel's Music Academy
Arunachal University of Studies
Bhatkhande Music Institute, Lucknow
University of Calcutta
Central University of Jharkhand
Chandigarh University
Chhatrapati Shahu Ji Maharaj University
Chinmaya University
University of Delhi
Dibrugarh University
Indira Kala Sangeet University
University of Kerala
Anuragdixit's musicology
Lovely Professional University
University of Madras
Manipur University
Martin Luther Christian University
M.S. University, Baroda
University of Mumbai
Prayag Sangeet Samiti
Rabindra Bharati University
Raja Mansingh Tomar Music & Arts University
Sikkim University
Swarnabhoomi Academy of Music
Tripura University
Visva-Bharati University
Kala Academy
प्राचीन कला केन्द्र

Institut Seni Indonesia Padang Panjang
Institut Seni Indonesia Yogyakarta
Universitas Pelita Harapan
Institut Seni Indonesia Denpasar
Institut Kesenian Jakarta
Universitas Kristen Satya Wacana
Universitas Negeri Surabaya
Universitas Pasundan
Universitas HKBP Nommensen
Sekolah Tinggi Internasional Konservatori Musik Indonesia
Universitas Universal
Sekolah Tinggi Seni Musik Bandung

DIT Conservatory of Music and Drama
 Royal Irish Academy of Music
 Cork School of Music
 Leinster School of Music & Drama

Buchmann-Mehta School of Music (formerly Samuel Rubin Israel Academy of Music), Tel Aviv University Faculty of the Arts
 Israel Conservatory of Music
 Jerusalem Academy of Music and Dance
 Jerusalem Conservatory Hassadna
 Ron Shulamit Conservatory



State conservatories
State conservatories are third-level schools entitled to issue academic degrees in music.

 Conservatorio Statale "Domenico Cimarosa" (Avellino)
 Conservatorio Giovanni Battista Martini (Bologna)
 Conservatorio Bruno Maderna (Cesena)
 Conservatorio Luigi Cherubini (Florence)
 Conservatorio Umberto Giordano (Foggia)
 Conservatorio Niccolò Paganini (Genova)
 Conservatorio Giuseppe Verdi (Milan)
 Conservatorio San Pietro a Majella (Naples)
 Conservatorio Cesare Pollini (Padova)
 Conservatorio Gioachino Rossini (Pesaro)
 Conservatorio Santa Cecilia (Rome)
 Conservatorio Giuseppe Martucci (Salerno)
 Conservatorio Giuseppe Verdi (Torino)
 Conservatorio Giuseppe Tartini (Trieste) 
 Conservatorio Benedetto Marcello (Venice)

For a completer list of Italian state conservatories, see :it:Conservatori di musica in Italia

Higher Institutes of Musical Studies
Non-state  are third-level schools as well; they are officially recognized as equivalent to a state conservatory and issue the same academic degrees.

 Istituto superiore di studi musicali della Valle d'Aosta (Aosta)
 Istituto superiore di studi musicali Gaetano Donizetti (Bergamo)
 Istituto superiore di studi musicali Vincenzo Bellini (Caltanissetta)
 Istituto superiore di studi musicali Claudio Merulo (Castelnovo ne' Monti)
 Istituto superiore di studi musicali Claudio Monteverdi (Cremona)
 Istituto superiore di studi musicali Giacomo Puccini (Gallarate)
 Istituto superiore di studi musicali Pietro Mascagni (Livorno)
 Istituto superiore di studi musicali Luigi Boccherini (Lucca)
 Istituto superiore di studi musicali Orazio Vecchi - Antonio Tonelli (Modena and Carpi)
 Istituto superiore di studi musicali P. I. Tchaikovsky (Nocera Terinese)
 Istituto superiore di studi musicali Franco Vittadini (Pavia)
 Istituto superiore di studi musicali Giuseppe Verdi (Ravenna)
 Istituto superiore di studi musicali Achille Peri (Reggio Emilia)
 Istituto superiore di studi musicali Arturo Toscanini (Ribera)
 Istituto superiore di studi musicali Giovanni Lettimi (Rimini)
 Istituto superiore di studi musicali Rinaldo Franci (Siena)
 Istituto superiore di studi musicali Giovanni Paisiello (Taranto)
 Istituto superiore di studi musicali Giulio Briccialdi (Terni)

Other institutions
There are also other institutions of higher musical education that offer world-renowned master classes and courses, but they are not legally equivalent to conservatories and are not usually entitled to issue official academic degrees in accordance with the Bologna Process.
 Accademia Musicale Chigiana (Siena)
 Accademia Nazionale di Santa Cecilia (Rome)
 Fiesole School of Music (Fiesole) (also entitled to issue bachelor's degrees in many instruments, including voice)

Kunitachi College of Music
 Kyoto City University of Arts
 Musashino Academia Musicae
 Nagoya College of Music
 Osaka College of Music
 Toho Gakuen School of Music
 Tokyo College of Music
 Tokyo University of the Arts
 ESP College of Entertainment Tokyo
 ESP College of Entertainment Osaka
 ESP College of Entertainment Fukuoka
 Musicians Institute Tokyo (MI Tokyo)

Kazakh National University of Arts
Kazakh National Academy of Arts T K Zhurgenov
Kazakh National Conservatoire Kurmangazy

MUSEA (Music School of Eastern Africa) (Kisumu)
 Kenya conservatoire of Music
 Wynton house of music

Conservatoire Libanais
 Université Saint-Esprit de Kaslik 
 Notre Dame University

Lithuanian Academy of Music and Theatre

Escher Conservatoire
 Conservatoire vum Norden
 Conservatoire vun der Stad Lëtzebuerg

Macao Polytechnic University, Faculty of Arts and Design

(Diploma, Bachelor's Degree, Postgraduate) Universiti Teknologi MARA Shah Alam
(Diploma, Bachelor's Degree, Postgraduate) Akademi Seni Budaya & Warisan Kebangsaan (ASWARA) Kuala Lumpur
(Diploma)Malaysian Institute of Art (MIA)
(Diploma)SEGI University & College
(Degree)SEGI University & College
Institute of Music, UCSI University
(Berklee transfer ,Diploma , Bachelor Degree) International College of Music (ICOM)
Sound & Music Design Academy, LIMKOKWING University
(Degree)University of Putra Malaysia (UPM)
(Degree)University of Malaya (UM)
(Master)University of Malaya (UM)
(Diploma, Bachelor, Master, Doctorate) Faculty of Music and Performing Arts, Universiti Pendidikan Sultan Idris/Sultan Idris Education University (UPSI)

University of Malta, Music Division within the Mediterranean Institute

UNAM - Facultad de Música
National Conservatory of Music
Escuela Superior de Música, CNA
Conservatorio de las Rosas, Morelia
Universidad Autónoma de Zacatecas, Unidad Académica de Artes
Monterrey College of Music and Dance
Fermatta Music Academy
Universidad Autónoma de Nuevo León – Facultad de Música
GMartell College of Music Technology & Audio
Universidad Autónoma de Chihuahua – Facultad de Artes

Mongolian State Conservatory

Rabat National Conservatoire of Music and Choreographic Arts
 Rabat Moulay Rachid Conservatoire
 Kenitra Conservatoire de Kénitra
 Fez Conservatoire de Fès 
Music institute in Fez

 Fez : Dar Adyel Center
 Casablanca Conservatoire
 Tétouan Conservatoire
 Tangier Conservatoire
 Chefchaouen Conservatoire
 Ksar El Kébir Conservatoire
 Marrakesh Conservatoire
 Meknès Conservatoire
 Taza Conservatoire
 Oujda Conservatoire
 Safi Conservatoire
 Laayoune Conservatoire
 Demnate Conservatoire
 Essaouira Conservatoire
 Khémisset Conservatoire
 Jerada Conservatoire
 Tiznit Conservatoire
 Beni Mellal Conservatoire
 Salé Conservatoire
 Agadir Conservatoire
 Sidi Kacem Conservatoire
 Temara Conservatoire
 Boujaad Conservatoire

ArtEZ Conservatorium (Arnhem / Zwolle / Enschede) 
Music Academy Haarlem (Haarlem) 
Conservatorium van Amsterdam (Amsterdam) 
Academie voor Popcultuur (Academy for Pop Culture) (Leeuwarden) 
Conservatorium Maastricht (Maastricht) 
Fontys Conservatorium (Tilburg)
Royal Conservatoire (The Hague) 
Prince Claus Conservatoire (Groningen) 
Codarts (Rotterdam) 
Utrechts Conservatorium (Utrecht)

School of Music, National Institute of Creative Arts and Industries, University of Auckland (Auckland)
Department of Music, Faculty of Arts and Social Sciences, University of Waikato (Hamilton)
Te Kōkī, the New Zealand School of Music [NZSM] – a joint venture between Victoria University of Wellington and Massey University (Wellington / Albany)
Nelson School of Music (Nelson)
School of Music, College of Arts, University of Canterbury (Christchurch)
School of Music, Languages and Communication; Faculty of Health, Humanities and Science; Christchurch Polytechnic Institute of Technology (Christchurch)
Department of Music, University of Otago (Dunedin)

Polytechnic University of Nicaragua

Tenstrings Music Institute with Campuses in Festac Town, Ikeja, Surulere, Lekki and Port Harcourt
Peter King College of Music The home and Paradise for jazz musicians Badagri, Oko afo Ilogbo area in oko-afo
The Musical Society Of Nigeria (MUSON) School of Music,  8/9 Marina, Onikan, Lagos, Nigeria. Considered the foremost music conservatory in all of West Africa. MUSON awards a diploma degree over two years (six terms) of intensive studies. The diploma degree is equivalent to an associate degree in the United States but with more practical abilities on a primary instrument as well as in-depth knowledge in music theory and western music history. MUSON diploma students are required as part of the degree requirements to give two recitals, pass the MUSON or ABRSM grade seven exam on a primary instrument and in music theory, and play three minor instruments. For more information visit www.muson.org
University of Port-Harcourt Uniport Music Department Port-Harcourt Rivers state.  www.uniport.edu.ng

Agder University College, Faculty of Fine Arts (Kristiansand)
Baratt Due Institute of Music (Oslo)
Grieg Academy, the department of Music at the University of Bergen
Norwegian Academy of Music (Oslo)
Norwegian University of Science and Technology, Department of Music (Trondheim)
Tromsø University College, Faculty of Art – Music Conservatory
University of Stavanger, Department of Music and Dance

Palestine 

 Edward Said National Conservatory of Music "ESNCM"
 Al Kamandjâti "AK".

Universad de Panama, Facultad de Bellas Artes



Music Schools and Music Departments 
 Chiclayo: Escuela de Formación Artística Publica "Ernesto Lopez Mindreau"
 Arequipa: Universidad Nacional de San Agustín - Escuela de Artes 
 Ayacucho: Escuela Superior de Música Pública "Condorcunca"
 Cusco: Instituto Superior de Música "Leandro Alviña Miranda"
 Huánuco: Instituto Superior de Música "Daniel Alomía Robles"
 Ica: Escuela Superior de Música "Francisco Pérez Anampa" 
 Lima: Ams Campus - Escuela de Música Profesional y Popular 
 Lima: Escuela Nacional Superior de Folklore "Jose Maria Arguedas" 
 Lima: https://es.wikipedia.org/wiki/Universidad_Nacional_de_Música_(Perú)
 Lima: Universidad Nacional de Música (ex Conservatorio Nacional de Música - Página oficial
 Lima: Universidad San Martín de Porres - Instituto de Arte 
 Lima: Pontificia Universidad Católica del Perú - Escuela de Música 
 Lima: Universidad Peruana de Ciencias Aplicadas - Escuela de Música 
 Loreto: Escuela Superior de Música "Lorenzo Luján Darjón"
 Piura: Escuela Superior de Formación Artística Pública "José María Valle Riestra"

Conservatories 
 Arequipa: Conservatorio Regional de Música Luis Duncker Lavalle  
 Lima: Conservatorio Nacional de Música
 Lima: Conservatorio de Lima "Josafat Roel Pineda"  
 Trujillo: Conservatorio Regional de Música del Norte "Carlos Valderrama"

Centro Escolar University
De La Salle College of Saint Benilde
La Consolacion College Manila
New Era University
Philippine Normal University
Philippine Women's University
Silliman University College of Performing and Visual Arts
Santa Isabel College Manila
St. Paul University Manila
St. Scholastica's College Manila
University of the Philippines College of Music
University of San Agustin, Iloilo City
University of Santo Tomas Conservatory of Music

The Fryderyk Chopin University of Music in Warsaw
The Karol Szymanowski Academy of Music in Katowice
The Ignacy Paderewski Academy of Music in Poznan
The Academy of Music in Kraków
The Karol Lipiński University of Music in Wroclaw
The Art Academy of Szczecin
The Academy of Music in Gdańsk
The Academy of Music in Bydgoszcz
The Academy of Music in Łódź
Lviv Conservatory (former Polish–Lithuanian Commonwealth and Poland (until 1945), now within borders of Ukraine)

Department of Music, ILCH, University of Minho 
Escola Superior de Música de Lisboa, Instituto Politécnico de Lisboa 
Escola Superior de Música e Artes do Espectáculo, Instituto Politécnico do Porto 
Escola Superior de Artes Aplicadas, Instituto Politécnico de Castelo Branco 
Academia Nacional Superior de Orquestra 
Department of Music, University of Évora 
Department of Communication and Art, University of Aveiro 
 Department of Music, Escola Superior de Educação, Instituto Politécnico do Porto

Conservatorio de Música de Puerto Rico

Moscow Conservatory
St. Petersburg Conservatory
Gnessin State Musical College
Kazan Conservatory
Saratov Conservatory
Ulyanovsk State University
Ural State Conservatory
Moscow State University of Culture and Art
Murmansk College of Arts

Academy of Music Ljubljana

University of Arts in Belgrade Faculty of Music
University of Novi Sad Academy of Arts
University of Kragujevac Faculty of Philology and Arts
University of Niš College of Music (closed)
University of Niš Faculty of Arts
University of Priština Faculty of Arts

National University of Singapore Yong Siew Toh Conservatory of Music
Singapore Raffles Music College
Nanyang Academy of Fine Arts
LASALLE College of the Arts
Lee Wei Song School of Music

Department of Music at Nelson Mandela University
South African College of Music at the University of Cape Town
 Department of Music at the University of Pretoria
 Department of Music at the University of the Witwatersrand
 Conservatorium at the University of Stellenbosch
 NWU School of Music & Conservatory North-West University
 Odeion School of Music at the University of the Free State

Jeju National University
Chonnam National University
Dong-ah Institute of Media and Arts, Division of Applied Music, Department of Audio Production
Ewha Womans University, College of Music (established in 1925)
Hansei University
Hanyang University
Howon University, Department of Applied Music
Keimyung University
Korea National University of Arts, School of Music
Kyung Hee University
Kyungpook National University
Pusan National University, Department of Music, Department of Korean Music
Seoul National University, College of Music
Seoul Jazz Academy
Sookmyung Women's University, College of Music
Yonsei University
University of Seoul

Conservatorio Superior de Musica de Aragon
Conservatorio Superior de Música del Liceo
Escuela Superior de Música de Catalunya
Escuela Superior de Música Reina Sofía
Real Conservatorio Superior de Música
Escuela de Música Joaquín Turina de Sevilla
Conservatorio Superior de Música "Joaquín Rodrigo" de Valencia
Conservatorio Superior de Música de A Coruña
Conservatorio Superior de Música de Vigo
MUSIKENE Centro Superior de Música del País Vasco
Conservatorio Superior de Música "Eduardo Martínez Torner" del Principado de Asturias
Conservatorio Superior de Música de Canarias
Conservatorio Superior de Música de Castellón
Conservatorio Superior de Música "Bonifacio Gil" de Badajoz
Conservatorio Superior de Música de Castilla y León
Conservatorio Superior de Música "Joaquín Rodrigo" de Valencia
Conservatorio Superior de Música "Óscar Esplá" de Alicante
Conservatorio Superior de Música de las Islas Baleares
Conservatorio Superior de Música de Navarra
Conservatorio Superior de Música "Rafael Orozco" de Córdoba
Conservatorio Superior de Música "Victoria Eugenia" de Granada
Conservatorio Superior de Música de Jaén
Conservatorio Superior de Música de Málaga

Royal College of Music, Stockholm
Karlstad University
Göteborg University, department for performing arts and music
Örebro University, department for music
Luleå University of Technology, department for music and media
Lund University, Malmö Academy of Music

Hochschule Luzern
Hochschule der Künste Bern
Zurich University of the Arts
Hochschule Basel
EJMA Lausanne
Geneva University of Music
Haute école de musique de Lausanne
Conservatorio della Svizzera italiana

National Taiwan Normal University
 Taipei National University of Arts
 National Taiwan University of Arts
 Fu Jen Catholic University

Mahidol College of Music
 Rangsit Conservatory of Music
 
 
 
 Faculty of Music, Silpakorn University

Esom School of Music (Kampala)
  Kiwatule Music School (Kampala)

Uganda Music Academy 
https://www.facebook.com/Uganda-Music-Academy-UMAC-247933358907582/

Lviv Conservatory 
 Kiev Conservatory



England
 Academy of Contemporary Music
 Access to Music
 Brighton Institute of Modern Music
 Guildhall School of Music and Drama
 The Institute of Contemporary Music Performance
 London College of Music
 Leeds College of Music
 Royal Academy of Music
 Royal Birmingham Conservatoire
 Royal College of Music
 Royal Northern College of Music
 Tech Music Schools
 Trinity College of Music

Scotland

 Royal Conservatoire of Scotland

Wales
 Royal Welsh College of Music & Drama, Cardiff
 Cardiff University School of Music
 Wales International Academy of Voice, Cardiff

California
California Institute of the Arts
California State University, Fullerton
California State University, Long Beach Bob Cole Conservatory of Music
California State University, Northridge
Colburn School
San Francisco Conservatory of Music
University of California Berkeley School of Music
University of California Los Angeles Herb Alpert School of Music
University of Southern California Thornton School of Music
University of the Pacific Conservatory of Music
Colorado
Colorado State University, School of Music, Theatre and Dance
Connecticut
Hartt School of Music
Yale University
District of Columbia
Catholic University’s Benjamin T. Rome School of Music
Florida
Florida A&M (FAMU)
Florida Atlantic University
Florida Southern College
Florida State University College of Music
Full Sail University
Palm Beach Atlantic University
Palm Beach State College
Rollins College
Southeastern University
Stetson University
University of Miami Frost School of Music
University of Florida
University of Central Florida
University of North Florida
University of South Florida
University of Tampa
Idaho
University of Idaho
Illinois
Chicago College of Performing Arts of Roosevelt University
Columbia College Chicago Music Department
DePaul University
Illinois State University
North Park University
Northeastern Illinois University
Northern Illinois University
Northwestern University Bienen School of Music
Southern Illinois University Carbondale School of Music
Southern Illinois University Edwardsville School of Music
University of Chicago
University of Illinois at Chicago
University of Illinois School of Music (Urbana, IL)
Wheaton College Conservatory of Music
Indiana
Butler University
DePauw University School of Music
Indiana University Jacobs School of Music
University of Notre Dame Department of Music
Iowa
Luther College
University of Iowa
University of Northern Iowa School of Music
Kansas
University of Kansas
Kansas State University School of Music, Theatre and Dance
Kentucky
University of Louisville
Louisiana
Louisiana State University
Loyola University
Tulane University
University of New Orleans
Maine
University of Southern Maine School of Music
Maryland
Peabody Conservatory of Johns Hopkins University
University of Maryland School of Music
Massachusetts
Berklee College of Music
Boston Conservatory
Boston University
Longy School of Music
New England Conservatory of Music
Michigan
University of Michigan School of Music, Theatre & Dance
Michigan State University College of Music
Central Michigan University School of Music
Minnesota
Concordia College
McNally Smith College of Music
St. Olaf College
University of Minnesota School of Music
Mississippi
Mississippi College
University of Southern Mississippi
University of Mississippi
Missouri
University of Missouri School of Music
University of Missouri-Kansas City
Nevada
University of Nevada, Las Vegas (UNLV)
New Jersey
Kean University
Montclair State University
New Jersey City University
Ramapo College
Rowan University
Rutgers University New Brunswick
Rutgers University Newark
Westminster Choir College
William Paterson University
New York
Bard College Conservatory of Music
Brooklyn College Conservatory of Music
Five Towns College
Houghton College Greatbatch School of Music
Ithaca College School of Music
Juilliard School
Manhattan School of Music
Mannes College of Music
New York University, Steinhardt School
Syracuse University Setnor School of Music
The New School for Jazz and Contemporary Music
City College of New York
SUNY-Albany
SUNY-Fredonia School of Music
SUNY-Potsdam Crane School of Music
SUNY-Purchase Conservatory of Music
University of Rochester Eastman School of Music
North Carolina
Appalachian State University Mariam Cannon Hayes School of Music
East Carolina University School of Music
High Point University
University of North Carolina at Greensboro School of Music, Theatre and Dance
University of North Carolina School of the Arts
West Carolina University
North Dakota
North Dakota State University Challey School of Music
Ohio
Baldwin-Wallace Conservatory of Music
Bowling Green State University, College of Musical Arts
Cleveland Institute of Music
Kent State University
Oberlin Conservatory
The Ohio State University
The University of Akron
University of Cincinnati College-Conservatory of Music
Wright State University
Youngstown State University
Oklahoma
Oklahoma City University
University of Oklahoma
University of Central Oklahoma
Oregon
University of Oregon
Pennsylvania
Carnegie Mellon School of Music
Curtis Institute of Music
Duquesne University Mary Pappert School of Music
Indiana University of Pennsylvania
Lebanon Valley College
Mercyhurst College
Messiah College
Pennsylvania State University State College
Sunderman Conservatory of Music at Gettysburg College
Temple University
University of Pennsylvania
University of the Arts
West Chester University of Pennsylvania
Puerto Rico
Conservatory of Music of Puerto Rico
South Carolina
College of Charleston
University of South Carolina
Furman University Department of Music
Tennessee
Austin Peay State University
Belmont University
Middle Tennessee State University
Tennessee Technological University
University of Memphis
University of Tennessee, Knoxville
University of Tennessee, Martin
Vanderbilt University Blair School of Music
Visible Music College
Texas
Baylor University
Houston Christian University School of Music (SoM)
Rice University Shepherd School of Music
Stephen F. Austin State University Micky Elliott College of Fine Arts School of Music
Texas Tech University School of Music
University of Texas Sarah and Ernest Butler School of Music
University of North Texas College of Music
University of Houston Moores School of Music
West Texas A&M University School of Music
Utah
Brigham Young University School of Music
University of Utah School of Music 
Virginia
George Mason University
James Madison University
Virginia Commonwealth University
Christopher Newport University
Norfolk State University
Old Dominion University
Shenandoah University
Hampton University
Virginia Wesleyan University
Washington
Cornish College of the Arts
Pacific Lutheran University Department of Music
University of Puget Sound School of Music
University of Washington
West Virginia
West Virginia University
Marshall University
Wisconsin
Lawrence Conservatory of Music, Lawrence University
University of Wisconsin–Madison
University of Wisconsin–Milwaukee



Escuelas 
 Caracas: Escuela Superior de Música José Ángel Lamas
 Caracas: Escuela de Música Lino Gallardo
 Caracas: Escuela de Música Juan Manuel Olivares
 Caracas: Escuela de Música José Reyna
 Caracas: Escuela de Música Pedro Nolasco Colon
 La Grita: Escuela de Música Santa Cecilia
 Rubio: Escuela de Música Francisco J. Marciales
 San Cristóbal: Escuela de Música Miguél Ángel Espinel
 Trujillo: Escuela de Música Esteban Razquin

Conservatorios 
 Fundación del Estado para el Sistema Nacional de las Orquestas Juveniles e Infantiles de Venezuela 
 Carabobo: Conservatorio de Musica de Carabobo 
 Caracas: Conservatorio de Música Simón Bolívar 
 Caracas: Conservatorio Nacional de Música Juan José Landaeta
 Lara: Conservatorio Vicente Emilio Sojo

Universidades 
Pedagogía en Música:
 Universidad de Carabobo (UC) 
 Universidad Pedagógica Experimental Libertador (UPEL) 

Licenciatura en Artes mención Música
 Carabobo: Universidad Arturo Michelena (UAM) 
 Caracas: Universidad Central de Venezuela (UCV) 

Licenciatura en Música
 Caracas: Universidad Nacional Experimental de las Artes (UNEARTE)(antiguo IUDEM) 
 Lara: Universidad Centroccidental Lisandro Alvarado (UCLA) 
 Mérida: Universidad de Los Andes (Venezuela) (ULA) 
 Táchira: Universidad Nacional Experimental Abierta (UNET) 
 Zulia: Universidad Católica Cecilio Acosta (UNICA) 
 Zulia: Universidad del Zulia (LUZ) 
Maestría en Música
 Caracas: Universidad Simon Bolivar (USB) 

Maestría en Musicología
 Caracas: Universidad Central de Venezuela (UCV)

References

School
 
University and college schools of music